Jonathan Adam Pinson is an  American politician who has served as a Delegate from the 13th district to the West Virginia House of Delegates since 2020. Pinson is a Republican.

Early life, education, and career
Pinson was educated at West Virginia University at Parkersburg, a community college. He also graduated from the West Virginia police academy. Before running for office, Pinson served as a police officer with Jackson County, West Virginia and as a pastor.

Elections

2020
In his first primary, Pinson received 33.03% of the vote to be sent to the nomination alongside fellow Republican Joshua Higginbotham.

In the general, Pinson received 36.04%, the highest percentage in the select-two election to be sent to the House of Delegates.

2022
After redistricting, Pinson ran in the redrawn 17th House of Delegates District. He defeated Republican challengers Morgan Hurlow and Robert Marchal, receiving 79.8% of the vote to be nominated.

Tenure

Committee assignments
Agriculture and Natural Resources
Judiciary
Senior, Children, and Family Issues

Transgender rights
Pinson voted for a bill that would prohibit transgender athletes from competing on the team that aligns with their gender identity.

Worker's rights
Woodrum voted for SB 11, a bill that would make it more difficult for employees to strike.

DC statehood
With many of his fellow Delegates, Pinson signed onto a resolution requesting West Virginia Senators and Congresspeople to oppose bills that would allow statehood for the District of Columbia.

Personal life
Pinson is married to Amy Pinson and has three children. He is a Baptist and serves as a Baptist pastor.

References

Living people
People from West Virginia
Republican Party members of the West Virginia House of Delegates
21st-century American politicians
Baptists from West Virginia
Year of birth missing (living people)
West Virginia University at Parkersburg alumni